The mimic toadlet (Uperoleia mimula) is a species of frog in the family Myobatrachidae.
It is endemic to Australia.
Its natural habitats are subtropical or tropical swamps, dry savanna, moist savanna, subtropical or tropical seasonally wet or flooded lowland grassland, intermittent freshwater lakes, and intermittent freshwater marshes.

References

Uperoleia
Amphibians of Queensland
Taxonomy articles created by Polbot
Amphibians described in 1986
Frogs of Australia